Tula Rud may refer to:
 Tula Rud-e Bala
 Tula Rud-e Pain
 Tula Rud Rural District